Polyméca is a French network of engineering schools composed of seven grandes écoles teaching engineering and mechanics.

Members 
 The Supméca  
 The SeaTech
 The École d'ingénieurs ENSIL-ENSCI 
 The École nationale supérieure de techniques avancées de Bretagne (ENSTA Bretagne)
 The École nationale supérieure de mécanique et d'aérotechnique (ISAE-ENSMA)
 The École nationale supérieure de mécanique et des microtechniques (ENSMM)
 The École nationale supérieure d’électronique, informatique, télécommunications, mathématique et mécanique de Bordeaux (ENSEIRB-MATMECA)

References

External links
Official site

Polyméca